Sarah Golden (born October 24, 1983) is an American New-Folk Singer/Songwriter from Houston, Texas. She was a contestant on the second season of the American reality talent show The Voice, in 2012.

Personal life 
Born into an artistic and musical family, Sarah Golden is the youngest of three. Her mother was a vocal major, choir director and sang with the Houston Symphony Corral. Her Father holds a Masters in Fine Arts from the University of Houston and is a retired commercial photographer and Professor of Fine Arts. Her sister's background in technical theatre has lent itself to orchestrating light, sound and costume design for a number of theatres, including the Alley Theatre and Cullen Performance Hall. Her brother, Willy T. Golden, is a multi-instrumentalist who plays lap steel, dobro, pedal steel, guitar and mandolin and has been a member of the Louisiana Roots band The Bluerunners and can be seen with Houston acts Sean Reefer and the Resin Valley Boys, The Broken Spokes, Los Pistoleros, Jonathan Ross, Charlie Harrison and Brad Boyer, among others.

The Voice (2012) 
Sarah Golden was a contestant on the second season of NBC's reality television show, The Voice, which aired in 2012. She sang Lady Gaga's "You and I" for her blind audition and received chair turns from American country music singer, Blake Shelton, and Goodie Mob and Gnarles Barkley member, Cee Lo Green. She chose Cee Lo as her coach. Golden finished in the top 36 vocalists after the battle rounds, where she was paired against the season's runner-up, Juliet Simms. The two battled it out in a duet of Rod Stewart's, "Stay With Me", and Cee Lo chose Juliet as the winner.

Achievements 

Prior to her appearance on The Voice, Sarah finished in the top 150 contestants on the American reality television series on the NBC television network, America's Got Talent in 2009, where she advanced to the Las Vegas round before being eliminated.

She was also selected as a top-ten finalist in 2002 for The Grassy Hill Kerrville New Folk Competition at the Kerrville Folk Festival.

Throughout her career, Golden has played alongside such highly regarded artists as Amy Ray (Indigo Girls), Shawn Colvin, Sonia Tetlow (Cowboy Mouth), Susan Gibson, Ruthie Foster, Shake Russell, Melissa Ferrick, Terri Hendrix, Lloyd Maines, Trish Murphy and others.

Discography 
 Truth (2002)
 Sessions EP (2012)
 "The One I Love" single (2013)

In the Fall of 2012, Sarah released her E.P., "Sessions", which serves as a precursor to her upcoming sophomore album; currently being recorded and produced by Houston roots-music icon, Jack Saunders, at White Cat Studios.

External links 
 
 Official Twitter
 Sarah Golden HD interview, The Voice
 AfterEllen interview
 Houston Chronicle The Voice recap

American folk singers
Living people
1983 births
21st-century American singers
21st-century American women singers